Obereopsis obscuritarsis is a species of beetle in the family Cerambycidae. It was described by Chevrolat in 1855. It has a wide distribution in Africa.

Subspecies
 Obereopsis obscuritarsis parangolensis Breuning, 1979
 Obereopsis obscuritarsis similis (Jordan, 1894)
 Obereopsis obscuritarsis obscuritarsis Chevrolat, 1855
 Obereopsis obscuritarsis kenyana Breuning, 1956
 Obereopsis obscuritarsis ugandicola Aurivillius, 1926

References

obscuritarsis
Beetles described in 1855